Dłubnia Landscape Park (Dłubniański Park Krajobrazowy) is a protected area (Landscape Park) in southern Poland, established in 1981, covering an area of . Within the Landscape Park are two nature reserves.

Location
The Park lies within the Lesser Poland Voivodeship: in Kraków County (Gmina Iwanowice, Gmina Michałowice, Gmina Skała, Gmina Zielonki), Miechów County (Gmina Gołcza) and in Olkusz County (Gmina Trzyciąż).

The park takes its name from the river Dłubnia, which eventually flows into the Vistula in the Mogiła neighbourhood of Nowa Huta, within the city of Kraków. (There is also a neighbourhood – formerly a village – called Dłubnia, within the Wzgórza Krzesławickie district of the city.)

Notes and references

 Małopolskie (Lesser Poland) Voivodeship Official Website
 Agency for Regional Development of Lesser Poland - MARR
 General statistics

Landscape parks in Poland
Parks in Lesser Poland Voivodeship